The 2009 Island 300 was the twelfth event of the 2009 V8 Supercar Championship Series. It was held on the weekend of the November 7 and 8 at the Phillip Island Grand Prix Circuit in Victoria. The meeting was a late addition to the calendar, V8 Supercar having already raced at Phillip Island in September at the 2009 L&H 500. The round was organised after the Desert 400, set to be held at the Bahrain International Circuit, was removed from the 2009 calendar and shifted into the 2010 season in order to better link up with the newly announced round to be held at nearby Yas Marina Circuit in Abu Dhabi.

The event was won by Triple Eight Race Engineering Ford driver Jamie Whincup. The pair of race victories (scoring a maximum 300 points) moved him significantly closer to retaining the V8 Supercar Championship Series crown he first won in 2008, building his lead over Holden Racing Team driver Will Davison to over 100 points. Rick Kelly of Kelly Racing was second for the event, scoring 267 points from a third in Race 21 and a second in Race 22. Third was Davison's HRT teammate Garth Tander, scoring 249 points.

Results

Qualifying
Qualifying timesheets:

Race 21
Race timesheets:

Race 22
Race timesheets:

Standings
 After Race 22 of 26

References

External links
Official series website
Official results and timing

NOTE:  The standard sprint race format was used for the race that replaced Bahrain only, so in 2009 there were two Phillip Island races.

Island 300
Motorsport at Phillip Island
November 2009 sports events in Australia